Raymond Wilbur Hodgson Harry (11 August 1909 – 25 October 1991) was an Australian rules footballer who played with Carlton in the Victorian Football League (VFL).

Notes

External links 

Ray Harry's profile at Blueseum

1909 births
1991 deaths
Carlton Football Club players
Australian rules footballers from Victoria (Australia)
Traralgon Football Club players